Alvastra is a small village in Ödeshög Municipality in eastern Sweden. It is known for being the seat of the Cistercian Alvastra Abbey in the Middle Ages, established in 1143 by French monks. After the Swedish Lutheran reformation in the 1530s, the monastery was demolished, never to be rebuilt.

The Alvastra monastery ruin is today well preserved and popular place to visit.

See also
Alvastra pile-dwelling

References

Populated places in Östergötland County